Shinshū Maru (神州丸 or 神洲丸) was a ship of the Japanese Imperial Army during World War II. She was the world's first landing craft carrier ship to be designed as such, and a pioneer of modern-day amphibious assault ships. During some of her operations, she was known to have used at least four cover names, R1, GL, MT, and Ryujo Maru.

Shinshū Maru was one of the ships sunk by friendly torpedo fire at the Battle of Sunda Strait, but later salvaged and returned to service.

Design features
Shinshū Maru was a significant advance in amphibious warfare, having incorporated numerous innovative features, and as such she was shrouded in a veil of secrecy throughout her existence. She could carry 29 , 25  and four AB-Tei-class armoured gunboats, to be launched from a floodable well deck.

In addition, it was planned that Shinshū Maru should carry aircraft in a hangar within her voluminous superstructure. The aircraft would have been launched by two catapults to support amphibious assaults, but the catapults were removed before completion and the ship never carried any operational planes.

These concepts pioneered by Shinshū Maru persist to the current day, in the U.S. Navy's LHA and LHD amphibious assault ships.

Fate
On 3 January 1945, while returning to Takao after a supply mission to Leyte Island, Shinshū Maru was heavily damaged by a US air attack by Task Force 38; after the ship was abandoned she was sunk by the submarine  in the Formosa Straits off Takao.

Photos

See also
Dock landing ship
Japanese Special Naval Landing Forces - Part of the Land Forces of the Imperial Japanese Navy

References

Sources
  Murray, Williamson and Millett, Alan R.  Military Innovation in the Interwar Period.  Cambridge:  Cambridge University Press, 1996.  .

External links 
 Landing Craft Carrier "Shinshu Maru"

World War II naval ships of Japan
Ships of the Imperial Japanese Army
Ships sunk by American submarines
1934 ships
Ships built by IHI Corporation
Amphibious warfare vessels of Japan
Japanese inventions